Leroy Moore may refer to:

 Leroy Moore (American football coach), active 1953–1955
 Leroy Moore (American football player) (born 1935), active 1961–1965
 Leroy F. Moore Jr. (born 1967), African American writer, poet, community activist, and feminist